Elections to choose members of the North Carolina Council of State (who head executive branch departments) were held on Tuesday, November 2, 2004. 

In all but two races (Superintendent of Public Instruction and Labor Commissioner), incumbent Democrats sought re-election.

The U.S. Presidential election, U.S. House election, U.S. Senate election, North Carolina gubernatorial election, North Carolina General Assembly election, and North Carolina judicial elections were all held on the same day.  Note that the Governor and Lt. Governor are also members of the Council of State, but their elections are covered in the article on the 2004 gubernatorial election.

On a national level, Republican George W. Bush captured the state's electoral votes while incumbent Democratic governor Mike Easley won a second term.

Secretary of State

Incumbent Democratic  Secretary of State Elaine Marshall defeated both a primary challenge from Doris A. Sanders and from Republican challenger Jay Rao.

State Auditor

Les Merritt, a former Wake County commissioner, and 2000 candidate, narrowly defeated 3-term incumbent State Auditor Ralph Campbell.

Attorney General

North Carolina's incumbent Attorney General, Roy Cooper, defeated Republican challenger Joe Knott.

State Treasurer

Incumbent State Treasurer Richard H. Moore defeated Republican challenger Edward Meyer by an eight-point margin.

Superintendent of Public Instruction

Results of November 2, 2004

General Assembly vote of August 24, 2005

With the resignation of Mike Ward, the Superintendent of Public Instruction race was the only 2004 Council of State contest in which there was no incumbent; consequently both major parties saw contested primaries. On the Republican side, former Wake County board of education member Bill Fletcher easily bested retired professor Jeanne Smoot. The Democratic primary between state Department of Instruction official June Atkinson,  North Carolina Board of Education member J. B. Buxton and state agricultural education coordinator Marshall Stewart led to a second primary. Stewart polled narrowly ahead of Atkinson in the first primary, but failed to capture the 40% support needed to take the nomination. In a statewide runoff primary, Atkinson captured the Democratic nomination. 

The race, along with the race for Agriculture Commissioner (see below) was caught up for nearly a month in a statewide recount because of the narrow margin. Fletcher argued that provisional ballots, required under the Help America Vote Act of 2002 for federal races, were improperly counted in state races under North Carolina law. However, on 30 November 2004, the State Board of Elections certified Atkinson the winner. Fletcher appealed the recision to the North Carolina Supreme Court.  Atkinson, in turn, petitioned the North Carolina General Assembly to resolve the disputed election.  On August 24, 2005, the General Assembly met in a joint session to vote on the disputed election, as the state constitution called for. Atkinson won this vote and was sworn-in that afternoon.

The election of the Superintendent of Public Instruction was the last American election from 2004 to be decided.

North Carolina Commissioner of Agriculture

Interim Agriculture Commissioner Britt Cobb defeated former state representative Tom Gilmore to take the Democratic nomination; Steve Troxler, the 2000 candidate for this position, was unopposed for the Republican nomination. 

Because of the loss of about 4,000 votes in Carteret County, North Carolina, the race for State Agriculture Commissioner could not be resolved for several months. Although the North Carolina Board of Elections certified the close race for State Superintendent of Public Instruction on 30 November 2004, they reached an impasse on the Agriculture Commissioner Race, splitting 3-2 in favor of calling a new statewide election for the seat over calling a new election in Carteret County alone; 4 votes would have been required to take action on either option.

In early December, the North Carolina Board of Elections ordered a new election for January 11, 2005, in Carteret County alone, for voters whose ballots had been lost or who had not voted in the November 2 election. Both candidates appealed the decision, Cobb arguing that a statewide revote should be held, Troxler arguing that a revote should be limited to those voters whose votes were lost. A Wake County superior court judge overturned this decision on December 17, calling it "arbitrary and capricious" and "contrary to law," requiring the State Board of Elections to revisit the issue.

On December 29, the State Board of Elections ordered a new statewide election for the post. On January 13, 2005, the superior court invalidated this order as well, and sent the contest back to the Elections Board for resolution. Following this ruling, Cobb conceded defeat. On February 4, the State Board of Elections officially certified Troxler as the winner of the 2004 election.

Commissioner of Labor

Incumbent Cherie Berry, the only sitting Republican on the Council of State, defeated both a primary challenge from Lloyd T. Funderburg and a general election challenge from state representative Wayne Goodwin.

State Insurance Commissioner

Five-term incumbent Jim Long defeated a challenge from Republican C. Robert Brawley to win the greatest number of votes for any candidate in the 2004 Council of State elections.

References

Council of State
2004
North Carolina Council of State